The Canterville Ghost (original title: Le Fantôme de Canterville) is a 2016 French-Belgian family comedy film directed and edited by Yann Samuell. The film is based on a 1887 short story of the same name by Oscar Wilde.

Plot summary

Cast 
 Audrey Fleurot as Aliénor de Canterville 
 Michaël Youn as Gwilherm
 Michèle Laroque as Elisabeth Otis
 Lionnel Astier as Alain Otis
 Mathilde Daffe as Virginia Otis 
 Julien Frison as Erwan

References

External links 
 

2016 films
2010s fantasy comedy films
French ghost films
2010s French-language films
French fantasy comedy films
Belgian fantasy comedy films
Films directed by Yann Samuell
Films based on The Canterville Ghost
Films set in castles
2016 comedy films
2010s French films